The Presbyterian Manse is a historic church parsonage at the northeast corner of Alley and Delta Streets in Jefferson, Texas.

It was built in 1839 and added to the National Register in 1969.

See also

National Register of Historic Places listings in Marion County, Texas
Recorded Texas Historic Landmarks in Marion County

References

External links

Clergy houses in the United States
Houses in Marion County, Texas
Jefferson, Texas
Presbyterian churches in Texas
Houses completed in 1839
Houses on the National Register of Historic Places in Texas
National Register of Historic Places in Marion County, Texas